Lake Sawyer is a freshwater lake in Black Diamond, Washington.

Lake Sawyer is underlain by glacial outwash and till dating from the Vashon Glaciation, as well as older glaciations that occurred during the Pleistocene. The bedrock underlying this mass of sediments is classified as the Hammer Bluff Formation, which was deposited in the Miocene epoch and consists of sandstone with some volcanic deposits. Groundwater outflow from the lake is believed to occur primarily in the northeast and southwest corners. Lake Sawyer is classified as mesotrophic, with algal growth limited by phosphorus availability. A 1994 survey found 23 species of plants growing in the lake and along its shorelines, including the invasive Myriophyllum spicatum and Nymphaea odorata.

A concrete dam was built at the outlet in 1952 to regulate the lake level. Beginning in 1983, the city of Black Diamond discharged outflow from a wastewater treatment plant near the outlet of Rock Creek, one of the lake's main inflows, into the lake. After a 1989 study determined that the plant was causing eutrophication of the lake, the outflow was diverted into a sewer line in 1992.

Lake Sawyer is stocked with rainbow trout, coastal cutthroat trout, and kokanee salmon for recreational fishing. Several resident species such as largemouth bass can also be caught in the lake.

References

Bibliography
 
 
 

Lakes of King County, Washington